The Gyeongnam Ilbo is one of two daily newspapers serving Gyeongsangnam-do in southeastern South Korea.  It is headquartered in Sangpyeong-dong, Jinju.  Its principal competitor is the Kyongnam Shinmun, based in Changwon.  

The Gyeongnam Ilbo printed its first issue on October 15, 1909.

See also
List of newspapers
Communications in South Korea

External links
Gyeongnam Ilbo website, in Korean

Newspapers published in South Korea
South Gyeongsang Province
Mass media in Jinju